The International Network of Street Papers (INSP) is a Glasgow, Scotland, based trade organization founded in 1994 for over 100 street newspapers from 35 countries. INSP organises a yearly conference and provides technical assistance and a wire service for street papers.

Street News Service

Street News Service (SNS) is a news agency for street newspapers run by the International Network of Street Papers. It carries articles, essays and news from newspapers sold and sometimes written by homeless and poor people. It helps street papers worldwide to share stories with each other with other alternative press. Mainstream news services Thomson Reuters and Inter Press Service support SNS with photos and training.

The news service is distributed weekly in three languages to over 200 journalists. SNS also has a team of 46 volunteers translators, offering translation to 15 languages.

It was originally started as a collaboration between the North American Street Newspaper Association and AlterNet.

References

External links
 International Network of Street Papers

Street newspaper organizations
Newspaper associations
Organisations based in Glasgow